Quanzhang may refer to:

Quanzhang, Shanxi (泉掌), a town in Xinjiang County, Shanxi, China
Quanzhang (泉漳), a coastal region in southeastern Fujian, China, centering around Quanzhou and Zhangzhou
Qingyuan Jiedushi, de facto independent warlords who controlled this region from  947 to 978 during the Five Dynasties period and Song dynasty
Hokkien, also known as Quanzhang dialect

See also
Hoklo, native Hokkien speakers